Shuangxi District is a rural district in the eastern part of New Taipei City, Taiwan.

Tourist attractions

 Beishi River Historical Trail
 Pingxi Historical Trail
 Buyan Pavilion
 Shuangxi Sanzhong Temple

Transportation

 TRA Mudan Station
 TRA Shuangxi Station

See also

 New Taipei City

References

External links

  

Districts of New Taipei